Kolp may refer to:

Places
 Kolp (river), a river in Leningrad Oblast and Vologda Oblast (Russia)

People
 Pierre Kolp, Belgian composer
 Ray Kolp, American baseball player

Fictional characters
 Kolp a character in the Planet of the Apes movie series

Other
 KOLP-LP, a defunct low-power radio station (100.3 FM) formerly licensed to serve Olympia, Washington, United States